Leonardo Rojas (born 9 October 1961) is a Peruvian footballer. He played in 33 matches for the Peru national football team from 1983 to 1989. He was also part of Peru's squad for the 1987 Copa América tournament.

References

External links
 

1961 births
Living people
Peruvian footballers
Peru international footballers
Place of birth missing (living people)
Association football defenders
León de Huánuco managers